Czechoslovakia is a Norwegian duo based in Stavanger, Norway. Their musical style is described as dreamy, electronica pop with emphasis on moods.

History 
Czechoslovakia consists of singer and composer Tore Meberg and producer Edvard Brygfjeld. Musically they come from very different backgrounds. Tore is also front man in the group The Love Revolt, but also has experience as singer, guitar and keyboard player from band such as Watershed. Edvard has been involved in several other projects, f.ex. Butti49 and Elak.

Members 
Tore Meberg – vocals, piano, synthesizers, acoustic guitar, bass, composer
Edvard Brygjeld – programming, bass, electric guitar, producer

Discography 

 Moods we used to make (2010)
 Beirut (2010)
 Subtle Standards (2011)

Other works 
 Himmelblå, sangene fra serien (2008)

Awards 
2007: Voted "Ukas urørt" on Norwegian radio station NRK P3 for the song "Moods we used to Make"

Notes

External links 
  
 Facebook fan page 
 Czechoslovakia on Amazon.com 

Norwegian musical groups
Musical groups established in 2003